Gabriel Valenzuela (born June 10, 1981) is a Colombian model and actor.

Filmography

Television

Guest

Awards and nominations

References

External links 

Male actors from Bogotá
Colombian male telenovela actors
1981 births
Living people
21st-century Colombian male actors
20th-century Colombian male actors